Downtown Buckhannon Historic District is a national historic district located at Buckhannon, Upshur County, West Virginia. It encompasses 57 contributing buildings and one contributing structure that include the civic and commercial core of Buckhannon. Most of the buildings in the district date from the late-19th and early-20th century in popular architectural styles, such as Italianate, Queen Anne, Colonial Revival, and Classical Revival.  Notable buildings include the Presbyterian Church on Locust Street (1879), T. L. Stockert Building (1908), Peoples Bank Building (1910), Upshur County Court House, and U.S. Post Office (1916).

It was listed on the National Register of Historic Places in 2009.

References

National Register of Historic Places in Upshur County, West Virginia
Historic districts in Upshur County, West Virginia
Colonial Revival architecture in West Virginia
Neoclassical architecture in West Virginia
Italianate architecture in West Virginia
Queen Anne architecture in West Virginia
Buildings and structures in Upshur County, West Virginia
Historic districts on the National Register of Historic Places in West Virginia